Gorgus was a mining engineer (metalleutes) who accompanied Alexander the Great. He found gold and silver mines in the territory of the Bactrian ruler, Sophytes.

References

Engineers of Alexander the Great
Ancient Greek engineers